Gazmend Leka is an Albanian painter and artistic director and scholar.

Biography

He finished his high school studies at the artistic "Jordan Misja" school in Tirana. He finished studies for painting and graphics at the ILA (today's Academy of Arts).

He was responsible for designing the interior of the "Gjergj Kastrioti-Skanderbeu" museum in Kruja. From 1982, for ten years he worked in the film studio "New Albania" ("Shqipëria e Re") as a painter and artistic director. He worked on two films and won an international award "Dea Fortunata" in Naples.

Since 1992 he has been Professor at the Academy of Arts, Tirana. As a painter he has made around 140 major painting exhibitions inside and outside Albania.

His artwork is typically in earthy tones such as brown or grey.

Prizes

 1982 - Order of "Naim Frashëri", Third class, Tirana, Albania
 1983 - First prize at "The Fifth Festival of Animated Movies", Albania
 1983 - Prize of "Dea Fortunata" At International Festival of  Animated Movies, Naples, Italy
 1984 - Prize of Republic, third class, Tirana, Albania
 1985 - First prize at "The Sixth Festival of Animated Movies", Albania
 1986 - Prize of "Odhise Paskali" for the best performance of the year, Tirana, Albania
 1987 - First National Price for Graphic
 1988 - Order "Naim Frasheri", first class, Tirana, Albania
 1994 - Second prize "Onufri", National competition "G.K.A", Tirana, Albania
 1995 - Second prize "Onufri", National competition "G.K.A", Tirana, Albania
 1999 - Second prize for animated movie (Panorama e Filmit), Tirana, Albania
 2000 - Prize of the Year "Painter of the Year", Magazine Kult 2005, Tirana, Albania

References

External links
Official website
Artwork examples

Albanian painters
1953 births
Living people
People from Tirana